The Silas N. Pearman Bridge, known locally as the New Cooper River Bridge from the opening date to the groundbreaking of its replacement, was a cantilever bridge that crossed the Cooper River in Charleston, South Carolina, United States. It opened in 1966 to relieve traffic congestion on the companion John P. Grace Memorial Bridge. It was built by the South Carolina Department of Transportation and was designed by HNTB Corporation.

Design
At the time it opened, it consisted of two lanes to carry US 17 northbound traffic and one lane that was reversible. The two lanes of the Grace Bridge were then made to carry only southbound traffic. In this manner, the reversible lane could be used in the direction of heavy traffic in the mornings and evenings as Mount Pleasant was effectively a bedroom community at the time.

History
A ceremony to mark the start of construction of the Pearman Bridge was held on May 2, 1963.

Once the Grace Bridge was posted with a load limit and could not carry large trucks, the reversible lane was made southbound permanently. This made sure that trucks had access across the Cooper River at all times. Unfortunately, this also meant that there was always oncoming traffic on the Pearman Bridge. Fatal head-on collisions on the Pearman Bridge led to a debate about constructing a barrier to separate traffic. The debate was resolved when the transportation department installed plastic delineators on the bridge during its final years.

Demolition
Both bridges were replaced by the Arthur Ravenel, Jr. Bridge in 2005. Demolition on the Pearman Bridge started on August 6, 2005. One of the piers was intentionally left standing as a sort of memorial to the bridge, and can be seen by motorists getting onto the new bridge from East Bay Street in Charleston.

References

External links
 
  Unbuilding the Grace and Pearman Bridges A series of photo essays documenting the entire demolition process by Frank Starmer and Sparky Witte

Bridges completed in 1966
Demolished bridges in the United States
U.S. Route 17
Pearman
Road bridges in South Carolina
Bridges of the United States Numbered Highway System
Cantilever bridges in the United States
Truss bridges in the United States